Dion Dawkins (born April 26, 1994) is an American football offensive tackle for the Buffalo Bills of the National Football League (NFL). He played college football at Temple.

Early years
Dawkins attended Rahway High School in Rahway, New Jersey where he earned the nickname “the Shnowman.” After originally committing to the Cincinnati Bearcats, Dawkins signed with Temple in January 2013.

College career
Dawkins played at Temple from 2013 to 2016, starting 41 of 44 career games. Dawkins was named a First-team All-American Athletic Conference selection after his senior year.

Professional career
Dawkins received an invitation to the Senior Bowl and started at guard for the North team. The North lost 15-16 to the South and he was named the Senior Bowl's top offensive lineman. He improved his draft stock after practicing and performing well during the Senior Bowl. He attended the NFL Combine and completed all of the combine drills and positional drills. At Temple's Pro Day, Dawkins opted to attempt the vertical jump again and added two inches to his number from the Combine. He performed well in the positional drills with 40 scouts and representatives from all 32 NFL teams scouting him and 13 other teammates, including Temple's feature prospect, Haason Reddick. Dawkins had private workouts with four teams, including the San Francisco 49ers, Carolina Panthers, Denver Broncos, and Indianapolis Colts. The majority of NFL draft experts and analysts projected him to be a second round pick. He was ranked the second-best guard in the draft by Sports Illustrated, the third-best guard by ESPN, the third-best interior offensive lineman by NFL analyst Mike Mayock, and the fourth-best offensive tackle by NFL analyst Bucky Brooks and NFLDraftScout.com.

The Buffalo Bills selected Dawkins in the second round (63rd overall) of the 2017 NFL Draft. Dawkins was the second offensive guard drafted in 2017, behind Western Kentucky guard Forrest Lamp.

On May 19, 2017, the Buffalo Bills signed Dawkins to a four-year, $4.18 million contract with $1.83 million guaranteed and a signing bonus of $1.18 million. He played in all 16 games, starting 11 at left tackle in place of Cordy Glenn. Dawkins received an overall grade of 74.5 from Pro Football Focus in 2017.

Dawkins entered training camp in 2018 slated as the starting left tackle after the Buffalo Bills traded Cordy Glenn to the Cincinnati Bengals. Head coach Sean McDermott named Dawkins the starting left tackle to begin the regular season in 2018. In Week 10 of the 2018 season, against the New York Jets, Dawkins caught his first career pass, a seven-yard touchdown from quarterback Matt Barkley. 

In Week 16 of the 2019 season, against the New England Patriots, Dawkins caught his second touchdown pass from Josh Allen.

On August 13, 2020, Dawkins signed a four-year, $60 million contract extension with the Bills that includes $34 million guaranteed.

In 2021, he began training camp on the COVID-19 reserve list and needed some time to return to playing shape. Dawkins later revealed that he spent four days in the hospital battling the disease calling it “one of the lowest points" of his life.

References

https://www.espn.com/nfl/story/_/id/29655203/bills-dion-dawkins-reach-60-million-extension-2024-season

External links
Temple Owls bio
Buffalo Bills bio

1994 births
Living people
Rahway High School alumni
Sportspeople from Rahway, New Jersey
Players of American football from New Jersey
American football offensive tackles
American football offensive guards
Temple Owls football players
Buffalo Bills players
American Conference Pro Bowl players